Castrén is a football stadium in the Välivainio neighbourhood of Oulu, Finland.  The stadium holds 4 000 spectators. It is the home ground of sports clubs Oulun Luistinseura, JS Hercules and Oulun Palloseura.

References 

Football venues in Finland
Bandy venues in Finland
Sports venues in Oulu